Raymond Bernier (born November 6, 1952) is a Canadian politician in the  province of Quebec. He was first elected to represent the riding of Montmorency in the National Assembly of Quebec in the 2003 provincial election, but was defeated in the 2007 provincial election by Hubert Benoît of the Action démocratique du Québec. He was subsequently re-elected in the 2008 provincial election. He is a member of the Quebec Liberal Party.

Born in Quebec City, Quebec, Bernier obtained a college degree in administrative sciences from the Cégep de Limoilou and a bachelor's degree in the same field at the Université Laval.

Bernier worker for three years as financial management agent before working at the Commission de la santé et de la sécurité au travail (CSST) and the Ministries of Revenue and Transportation as well as for the Secretary of the Treasury Board.

He was also a councilor and substitute mayor for the municipality of Saint-Augustin-de-Desmaures in central for eight years. In addition to his election wins in 2003 and 2008, he was defeated as a Liberal candidate in La Peltrie in 1994. After his 2007 defeat, he worked as Chief Cabinet for Minister Monique Gagnon-Tremblay.

Electoral record

Federal politics

Provincial politics 

|}

^ Change is from redistributed results. CAQ change is from ADQ.

|-
 
|Liberal
|Raymond Bernier
|align="right"|9,124
|align="right"|22.62
|align="right"|

|-

|Independent
|François Martin
|align="right"|157
|align="right"|0.39
|align="right"|
|-

References

External links
 

1952 births
French Quebecers
Living people
Mayors of places in Quebec
Members of the Executive Council of Quebec
Politicians from Quebec City
Quebec Liberal Party MNAs
Université Laval alumni
21st-century Canadian politicians